The Battle of Landeshut was an engagement fought on 23 June 1760 during the Third Silesian War (part of the Seven Years' War).

A Prussian army of 12,000 men under General Heinrich August de la Motte Fouqué fought an Austrian army of over 28,000 men under Ernst Gideon von Laudon and suffered a defeat, with its commander wounded and taken prisoner. The Prussians lost 10,242 men including 1,927 killed along with 8,315 prisoners as well as 68 guns captured. The Austrians lost 774 killed and 2,195 wounded. The Prussians fought with resolution, surrendering after running out of ammunition.

References

External links
 Bitwa pod Kamienną Górą (1760 r.) - Schlacht bei Landeshut na portalu polska-org.pl

Bibliography
 Szabo, Franz A.J. The Seven Years War in Europe, 1757-1763. Pearson, 2008.

Battle of Landeshut (1760)
Battles of the Seven Years' War
Battles involving Prussia
Battles involving Austria
1760 in Austria
Battles of the Silesian Wars